This page is a list of Central American and Caribbean saints, blesseds, venerables, and Servants of God, as recognized by the Catholic Church. These people were born, died, or lived their religious life in any of the territories of North America excluding Mexico, Canada and the United States.

The first unquestioned presence of the Catholic Church in the Americas was in this region, when Christopher Columbus first set foot on San Salvador. The oldest tangible evidence of Catholicism in the New World, the Cruz de la Parra, is kept in what is now Cuba.

List of saints

The following is the list of saints, including the year in which they were canonized and the country or countries with which they are associated. As a fact, in the list Óscar Romero is the only native saint of Central America and the Caribbean. The rest were Spanish missionaries who carried out their apostolic work in these American countries.

 Louis Bertrand, Dominican priest (Panama and the Caribbean)
Declared Venerable: N/A
Beatified: 19 July 1608 by Pope Paul V
Canonized: 12 April 1671 by Pope Clement X
 Anthony Mary Claret, Archbishop of Santiago (Cuba)
Declared Venerable: 6 January 1926
Beatified: 25 February 1934 by Pope Pius XI
Canonized: 7 May 1950 by Pope Pius XII
 Ezequiel Moreno y Díaz, Augustinian Recollect (Dominican Republic)
Declared Venerable: 1 February 1975
Beatified: 1 November 1975 by Pope Paul VI
Canonized: 11 October 1992 by Pope John Paul II
 Peter of Saint Joseph Betancur, founder of the Order of Betlemitas (Guatemala)
Declared Venerable: 25 July 1771
Beatified: 22 June 1980 by Pope John Paul II
Canonized: 30 July 2002 by Pope John Paul II
 Óscar Romero, Archbishop of San Salvador (El Salvador)
Declared Martyr: 3 February 2015
Beatified: 23 May 2015 by Cardinal Angelo Amato
Canonized: 14 October 2018 by Pope Francis

List of blesseds
 Jacques-Jules Bonnaud, Jesuit priest, martyr in France (Haiti)
Declared Martyr: 1 October 1926 
Beatified: 17 October 1926 by Pope Pius XI
 Encarnación Rosal (born Maria Vicenta Rosal Vasquez), Betlemite Sister (Guatemala)
Declared Venerable: 6 April 1995
Beatified: 4 May 1997 by Pope John Paul II
 Carlos Manuel Rodríguez, layperson (Puerto Rico)
Beatified: 29 April 2001 by Pope John Paul II
 Maria Romero Meneses, Salesian Sister (Costa Rica and Nicaragua)
Declared Venerable: 18 December 2000
Beatified: 14 April 2002 by Pope John Paul II
 María Dolores Rodríguez Sopeña, foundress of the Sisters of the Catechetical Institute of Dolores Sopeña (active in Cuba 1873-1877)
Declared Venerable: 11 July 1992
Beatified: 23 March 2003 by Pope John Paul II
 José López Piteira, Augustinian deacon, martyr in Spain (Cuba)
Declared Martyr: 1 June 2007
Beatified: 28 October 2007 by Cardinal José Saraiva Martins
 José Olallo, Brothers Hospitallers of St. John of God (Cuba)
Declared Venerable: 16 December 2006
Beatified: 29 November 2008 by Cardinal José Saraiva Martins
 Ciriaco María Sancha y Hervás, cardinal (was a priest in Cuba; later Patriarch of the West Indies, Dominican Republic)
Declared Venerable: 28 April 2006 
Beatified: 18 October 2009 by Archbishop Angelo Amato
 Armando Oscar Valdes, Brothers Hospitallers of St. John of God, martyr in Spain (Cuba)
Declared Martyr: 5 July 2013 
Beatified: 13 October 2013 by Cardinal Angelo Amato
 Stanley Rother, American priest from Oklahoma City area who was a missionary and was martyred by 3 men (Guatemala)
Declared Martyr: 1 December 2016
Beatified: 23 September 2017 by Cardinal Angelo Amato
 Marcello Maruzzo, priest (Guatemala)
Declared Martyr: 9 October 2017
Beatified: 27 October 2018 by Cardinal Giovanni Angelo Becciu
 Luis Navarro, layman (Guatemala)
Declared Martyr: 9 October 2017
Beatified: 27 October 2018 by Cardinal Giovanni Angelo Becciu
 James Alfred Miller (Leo William) [Santiago], professed religious of the Brothers of the Christian Schools (De La Salle Brothers); martyr (Guatemala)
Declared Martyr: 7 November 2018
Beatified: 7 December 2019 by Cardinal José Luis Lacunza Maestrojuán
 José María Gran Cirera and 9 Companions, laypersons of the diocese of Quiché (Guatemala)
Declared Martyr: 23 January 2020
Beatified: 23 April 2021 by Archbishop Francisco Montecillo Padilla
 Rutilio Grande Garcia, Jesuit priest (El Salvador)
Declared Venerable: 21 February 2020
Beatified: 22 January 2022 by Cardinal Gregorio Rosa Chávez
 Manuel Solórzano, layman (El Salvador)
Declared Venerable: 21 February 2020
Beatified: 22 January 2022 by Cardinal Gregorio Rosa Chávez
 Nelson Lemus, layperson (El Salvador)
Declared Venerable: 21 February 2020
Beatified: 22 January 2022 by Cardinal Gregorio Rosa Chávez
 Cosme Spessotto, Capuchin priest (El Salvador)
Declared Venerable: 26 May 2020
Beatified: 22 January 2022 by Cardinal Gregorio Rosa Chávez

List of venerables
 Leo Dupont, layman (Martinique)
Declared Venerable: 21 March 1983
 Maria Antonia Paris, foundress of the Claretian Sisters (Cuba)
Declared Venerable: 23 December 1993
 Pierre Toussaint, layman (Haiti)
Declared Venerable: 17 December 1996
 Isabel Larrañaga Ramírez, foundress of the Sisters of Charity of the Sacred Heart of Jesus (Cuba)
Declared Venerable: 28 June 1999
 Jerónimo Usera, priest (Cuba)
Declared Venerable:  28 June 1999
 Félix Varela, priest (Cuba)
Declared Venerable: 14 March 2012
 Rafael Cordero Molina, layperson (Puerto Rico)
Declared Venerable: 9 December 2013
 Joseph Vandor, priest (Cuba)
Declared Venerable: 20 January 2017
 María Consuelo Sanjurjo Santos, foundress of the Congregation of the Servants of Mary, Ministers to the Sick (Puerto Rico)
Declared Venerable: 15 January 2019
 Augustin Arnaud Pagès (Nymphas Victorin), professed religious of the Brothers of the Christian Schools (De La Salle Brothers) (Haute-Loire, France – San Juan, Puerto Rico, Dominican Republic)
Declared Venerable: 6 April 2019

List of Servants of God

 Antonio de Valdivieso, bishop and protomartyr for the defense of the Native Americans (Nicaragua)
 Mariano Dubon Alonso, secular priest (Nicaragua)
 Remigio Salazar y Amador, secular priest (Nicaragua)
 Casimir Cypher (born Michael Jerome Cypher), Franciscan Conventual priest (Honduras)
 Moises Gonzalez Crespo, Augustinian priest (Panama)
 Mary Elizabeth Lange (Cuba) (Haiti) nun, founder of the Oblate Sisters of Providence
 José Atiliano Franco Arita (1950-1990), married layperson of the Diocese of Santa Rosa de Copán; Martyr (Honduras)
 Ana María Moreno Castillo [Niña Anita] (1887-1977), layperson of the Diocese of Chitré (Panama)
 Moisés Cisneros Rodríguez (1945-1991), professed religious of the Marist Brothers of the Schools; Martyr (Guatemala)
 Fernando González Saborío (1927-1957), priest of the Diocese of Tilaran-Liberia (Costa Rica)
 María Isabel (Marisa) Acuña Arias (1941-1954), child of the Archdiocese of San Jose de Costa Rica (Costa Rica)
 Juan Morrera Coll (Casiano María of Madrid) (1892-1965), professed priest of the Franciscan Capuchins (Costa Rica)
 Victor Manuel Sanabria Martínez (1898-1952), Archbishop of San Jose de Costa Rica (Costa Rica)
 Eduardo Tomás Boza Masvidal (1915-2003), titular bishop Vinda, auxiliary bishop of San Cristóbal de la Habana (Cuba)
 Adolfo Rodríguez Herrera (1924-2003), archbishop of Camagüey (Cuba)
 Zilda Arns Neumann (1934-2010), married Layperson of the Archdiocese of Curitiba (Haiti)
 Luis Sánchez Pacheco (1696), professed priest, Franciscan Friars Minor (Cuba)
 Tiburcio De Osorio (+1712-1715), professed priest, Franciscan Friars Minor (Cuba)
 María Josefa Yáñez González Del Valle (1917-1960), professed religious (Cuba)
 Santos Álvarez Molaguero (1904-1936), priest of the archdiocese of Madrid (Cuba)
 Salvador Riera Pau (1883-1936), priest of the diocese of Girona (Cuba)
 Juan Antonio Abreu Espinal (1914-1977), priest of the diocese of Higüey (Dominican Republic)
 Giovanni Francesco Fantino Falco (1867-1939), priest of the diocese of La Vega (Dominican Republic)
 Severiano Arrieta Gorrochategui (1907-1975), professed priest, Passionists (Dominican Republic)
 Emiliano Tardif (1928-1999), professed priest, founder, Community of the Servants of the Living Christ (Dominican Republic) 
 Louis-Gaston de Sonis (1825-1887), layperson of the diocese of Chartres; married; member, Secular Carmelites (Guadeloupe) 
 Gordon Anthony Pantin (1929-2000), archbishop of Port of Spain, Holy Ghost Father (Trinidad & Tobago)
 Luis Chávez (1901-1987), archbishop of San Salvador (El Salvador)
 Clara Ellerker (1875-1949), founder, Carmelite Sisters of “Corpus Christi” (Trinidad & Tobago)
 Aristides Calvani Silva (1918-1986), layperson of the archdiocese of Caracas; married (Trinidad & Tobago)
 Marguerite-Henriette Lebray (1759-1794), professed religious, Madelonnettes (Haiti)
 Ángel Baraibar Moreno (1910-1936), layperson of the archdiocese of Toledo (Puerto Rico)
 María Belen Guzmán Florit (1897-1993), founder, Dominican Sisters of Fatima (Puerto Rico)

Other open causes
Others have been proposed for beatification, and may have active groups supporting their causes. These include:
 Four U.S missionaries raped and murdered by a Salvadoran government death squad in 1980:
 Maura Clarke, Maryknoll Sister 
 Ita Ford, Maryknoll Sister 
 Dorothy Kazel, Ursuline Sister 
 Jean Donovan, laywoman
 Eduardo De La Fuente Serrano (1948-2009), priest of the archdiocese of Madrid (Cuba),
 Mariano Arroyo Merino (1932-2009), priest of the archdiocese of Havana (Cuba),
 Luís Ramón Peña González [Papilín] (1936-1960), seminarian of the diocese of Higüey (Dominican Republic)
 James Arthur MacKinnon (1932-1965), priest of the Scarboro Foreign Mission Society (Dominican Republic)
 Florinda Soriano de Muñoz [Mamá Tingó] (1921-1974), layperson of the archdiocese of Santo Domingo; married (Dominican Republic)
 Ernesto Goyeneche Echarri (1910-1995), priest of the archdiocese of Santo Domingo (Dominican Republic)
 Theresa Egan (1927-2000), professed religious, Sisters of Saint Joseph of Cluny (Saint Lucia)
 Eliseo Castaño de Vega (1925-1991), priest of the Congregation of the Mission (Puerto Rico)

See also
Roman Catholicism in North America
List of American saints and beatified people
List of Canadian Roman Catholic saints
List of Mexican Saints
List of Brazilian Saints
List of South American Saints
List of saints of the Canary Islands

References

 
"Hagiography Circle"

Catholic Church in North America
Lists of saints by place

Central America and the Caribbean